Deborah Mary Turness (born 4 March 1967) is an English journalist, former CEO of ITN, and current CEO of BBC News. Prior to this she held two positions in NBC News International where she was president of NBC News (2013–2017) and later President of NBC News International. Before NBC, Turness was editor of ITV News (2004–2013), which made her the UK's first female editor of the network news.

Early life
Born in Meriden, Solihull, England, Turness was educated at St Francis' College and The Knights Templar School in Baldock, Hertfordshire. Turness studied at the University of Surrey, where she took a degree in French and English; she then took a postgraduate course in journalism at the University of Bordeaux, France.

Career
Turness joined ITN in 1988 as a freelance producer in the Paris Bureau straight from university, before becoming ITN's North of England producer in 1991. In 1993, she joined the ITN Bureau in Washington as a producer. In 1991, she competed in the Paris to Peking Offroad 4x4 Car Rally.

In 2000, Turness was Deputy Editor of Five News before being promoted to Editor in 2002. At Five News she famously did away with desks in the studio, thereby introducing the concept of 'perching presenters'. During 2002, she worked on Channel 4's RI:SE as Producer before quitting after six months to rejoin ITV News as Deputy Editor. In 2004, she became the Editor of ITV News, being the first woman to become the head of network news. In 2008, Turness won 'The News and Factual Award' presented by Women in Television and Film. Also in 2008, she was the co-winner of an Amnesty International UK Media Awards for the television news report 'Too Young to Die - Children of the Frontline'. In 2010, she chaired the MediaGuardian Edinburgh International Television Festival.

As Editor of ITN, Turness presided over a series of scoops and world exclusives including the arrest of the London bomber and the leaked investigation report on the shooting of Jean Charles de Menezes. In May 2011, she was the only journalist invited to the Buckingham Palace State Banquet for Barack Obama. She was described as one of London's 1000 most influential people in 2011.

In 2013, she was appointed president of NBC News and served in the role until February 2017.  Under her leadership the news division had gains in ratings for Meet the Press and the Nightly News shows, but she appointed Jamie Horowitz to run Today, who only lasted ten weeks in the role. In response to the Brian Williams controversy over his misleading statements, Turness was criticized heavily. Vanity Fair reported that several NBC News executives were displeased at her work and felt she was not qualified to do the job.

In February 2017, Noah Oppenheim took over as president of NBC News and Turness was appointed president of a new division called NBC News International that was NBC's side in a partnership with Euronews, in which each network would contribute reporting to the other. She moved back to the UK.

In April 2021, Turness left her role at NBC and returned to ITN as Chief Executive Officer.

In January 2022, Turness was appointed CEO of BBC News. She joined the BBC Board in September 2022 for a two-year term.

Personal life
Turness lived in Shepherd's Bush in London with her first husband, television journalist Damien Steward. On 26 August 2011, she married John Toker, the former Director of Communications for Security and Intelligence at the Cabinet Office and an ITN producer. The couple have two children.

References

1967 births
Living people
People educated at St. Francis' College, Letchworth
People educated at The Knights Templar School, Baldock
English television journalists
English women journalists
ITN newsreaders and journalists
Alumni of the University of Surrey
NBC executives
Women television executives
Presidents of NBC News
People from Hertfordshire
British women television journalists
BBC News people
BBC executives
BBC Board members